Garland Deloid "Gar" O'Quinn (born July 1, 1935) is an American former gymnast. He is a five-time medalist, including three gold medals, at the Pan American Games. He competed at the 1960 Summer Olympics. In 1995, he was inducted into the US Gymnastics Hall of Fame.

Garland attended the United States Military Academy at West Point.

Bibliography
1971: The Effects of Practice Upon the Activity of Antagonistic Muscles During the Performance of a Motor Task

References

1935 births
Living people
American male artistic gymnasts
Olympic gymnasts of the United States
Gymnasts at the 1960 Summer Olympics
Sportspeople from Fort Worth, Texas
Pan American Games medalists in gymnastics
Pan American Games gold medalists for the United States
Pan American Games bronze medalists for the United States
Gymnasts at the 1959 Pan American Games
Gymnasts at the 1963 Pan American Games
20th-century American people
21st-century American people
Medalists at the 1959 Pan American Games
Medalists at the 1963 Pan American Games